Tüntül (also, Tyuntyul’ and Tyuntyuli) is a village and municipality in the Qabala Rayon of Azerbaijan.   It has a population of 2,500.

Notable natives
 Intigam Atakishiyev — National Hero of Azerbaijan.

References 

Populated places in Qabala District